Roshni Rastogi is an Indian television actress who plays various characters in daily Indian soap operas. Rastogi is an alumna of Sahejmoodra Acting Academy, and had her first television roles in the series Iss Pyaar Ko Kya Naam Doon, and Crazy Stupid Ishq. In 2015–17, she was seen playing the joint-lead role of Rani Aggarwal in STAR Plus's TV serial Mere Angne Mein, and was popular for this role. She has also appeared in many stageplays, in her seven years of theatre work.

Television

References

Living people
Indian television actresses
Indian stage actresses
21st-century Indian actresses
Year of birth missing (living people)